Querelle of Brest is a novel by the French writer Jean Genet. It was written mostly in 1945 and first published anonymously in 1947, limited to 460 numbered copies, with illustrations by Jean Cocteau. It is set in the midst of the port town of Brest, where sailors and the sea are associated with murder. Georges Querelle, its protagonist, is a bisexual thief, prostitute and serial killer who manipulates and kills his lovers for thrills and profit. The novel formed the basis for  Querelle (1982), Rainer Werner Fassbinder's last film.

References

1947 French novels
1940s LGBT novels
Novels by Jean Genet
Brest, France
Novels set in Brittany
Novels about serial killers
French LGBT novels
French novels adapted into films
Novels about French prostitution
Novels with bisexual themes